Thomas J. Walker was a footballer who played on the right-wing for Burslem Port Vale and Burton Swifts in the 1890s.

Career
Walker probably joined Burslem Port Vale in December 1891. He scored a goal on his debut at outside-right in a 3–1 defeat at Doncaster Rovers in a Midland League match on 12 December 1891. He was a first team regular and managed to bag a goal in the 2–0 Staffordshire Charity Cup final triumph over local rivals Stoke on 7 May 1892. He scored three goals in 15 Second Division games in the 1892–93 season. His first goal in the English Football League came on 24 September, in a 4–1 win over Crewe Alexandra at the Athletic Ground, and he later claimed goals in home defeats to Darwen and Ardwick. He was transferred to Burton Swifts in March 1893.

Career statistics
Source:

References

Year of birth missing
Year of death missing
English footballers
Association football wingers
Port Vale F.C. players
Burton Swifts F.C. players
Midland Football League players
English Football League players